Joseph R. Donovan Jr. is a former American diplomat who previously served as United States Ambassador to Indonesia.

Early life
Joseph R. Donovan Jr. graduated from Georgetown University's School of Foreign Service. He earned a master's degree from the Naval Postgraduate School.

Career
Donovan began his career as a Peace Corps volunteer in Seoul, South Korea, and he subsequently joined the United States Foreign Service, serving in Qatar. He was the Branch Chief of the Kaohsiung Branch Office, American Institute in Taiwan from 1989 to 1992, the Director of the USDS's Office of Chinese and Mongolian Affairs from 2003 to 2005, Deputy Chief of Mission at the Embassy of the United States, Tokyo from 2005 to 2008, and the Consul General in Hong Kong from 2008 to 2009. He was the Principal Deputy Assistant Secretary in the USDS's Bureau of East Asian and Pacific Affairs from 2009 to 2011, Associate Professor at the National Defense University from 2011 to 2012, and Foreign Policy Advisor to the Chairman of the Joint Chiefs of Staff from 2012 to 2014. He was the managing director of the Washington, D.C. office of the American Institute in Taiwan from 2014 to 2016.

Donovan presented his credentials as the United States Ambassador to Indonesia on January 12, 2017, and served until February 14, 2020.

References

External links

Living people
Walsh School of Foreign Service alumni
Naval Postgraduate School alumni
Peace Corps volunteers
National Defense University faculty
Ambassadors of the United States to Indonesia
United States Foreign Service personnel
Year of birth missing (living people)
Kaohsiung Branch Chiefs of the American Institute in Taiwan
Consuls general of the United States in Hong Kong and Macau
21st-century American diplomats